Nitte Manjappa Adyanthaya is an Indian politician and trade union leader affiliated with the Indian National Congress.

Biography
Adyanthaya entered politics when he joined the Indian National Congress. He was elected to the Karnataka Legislative Assembly from the Surathkal constituency in 1985. He has also been actively involved in Trade union and labour right activism. Currently he is a Member of the Governing Body of the International Labour Organization, Member of India-Europe Civil Society, Spokesperson of Worker's Group, International Programme on the Elimination of Child Labour, Vice President – Indian National Trade Union Congress (National), Trustee – New Mangalore Post Trust and President of the Indian National Trade Union Congress (Karnataka State).

See also
 B. Subbayya Shetty

References

Living people
People from Udupi
Karnataka MLAs 1985–1989
International Labour Organization people
Trade unionists from Karnataka
Indian National Congress politicians from Karnataka
Indian officials of the United Nations
Year of birth missing (living people)